The Association of Football Statisticians (AFS) is an organisation which collates the historical and statistical records for domestic and international Association football.

References

External links
11v11
Live Football Scores & Sport Results

Association football organizations
1978 establishments in the United Kingdom
Sports organizations established in 1978
Sports organisations in London
Football organisations in the United Kingdom